El Siglo is a newspaper edited in the city of San Miguel de Tucumán, Tucumán Province, Argentina. It was founded on December 4, 1990, as Siglo XXI, but following its sale in 1998, the name was changed to its current form. The daily ranks third in the city of Tucumán by circulation, behind La Gaceta and El Tribuno de Tucumán.

External links 
Official site

1990 establishments in Argentina
Daily newspapers published in Argentina
Mass media in San Miguel de Tucumán
Publications established in 1990
Spanish-language newspapers